Gymnothorax baranesi is a moray eel found in the western Indian Ocean, around the Gulf of Aqaba, Israel, and the Red Sea. It was first named by D.G. Smith, E. Brokovich, and S. Einbinder in 2008.

References

baranesi
Fish of the Indian Ocean
Fish described in 2008